William Stone (born February 25, 1963) is a former American football fullback in the Arena Football League for the Chicago Bruisers. He is also a former NFL running back for the Los Angeles Rams (Signed with the Rams as a free agent in 1985). He played college football at Adams State University. Stone was the first ever Ironman of the Year in the AFL.

References

1963 births
Living people
American football fullbacks
American football linebackers
Adams State Grizzlies football players
Chicago Bruisers players
National Football League replacement players